Zaydan Bello (born 24 June 2002) is an Australian professional soccer player who plays for Minnesota United FC 2.

In September 2022, he left Melbourne Victory.

On 8 December 2022, he signed with the MLS Pro side Minnesota United FC 2.

References

External links

2002 births
Living people
Australian soccer players
Association football forwards
Melbourne Victory FC players
A-League Men players
National Premier Leagues players